Çankaya Çağdaş Sanatlar Merkezi is a concert hall in Ankara. It was founded in 1994.

External links
 

Entertainment venues in Ankara
Concert halls in Ankara